Fallujah is a district in Al Anbar Governorate, Iraq.  Its seat is the city of Fallujah.

Cities
Fallujah (pop. 350,000) 
Saqulauiah
Amiriyah Fallujah
Al Karmah
Al Enaimih 
Habbaniyah (pop. 80,000) 
Al Rahaliyah 
Al Khaldiya 
Al Zaidan
Al Fars

Districts of Al Anbar Governorate

References